Stercutus is a genus of annelids belonging to the family Enchytraeidae.

The species of this genus are found in Europe.

Species:

Stercutus niveus

References

Annelids